3794 Sthenelos  is a mid-sized Jupiter trojan from the Greek camp, approximately  in diameter. It was discovered on 12 October 1985, by American astronomer Carolyn Shoemaker at the Palomar Observatory in California. The presumed C-type asteroid has a rotation period of 12.9 hours. It was named after the Greek warrior Sthenelus from Greek mythology.

Orbit and classification 

Sthenelos is a dark Jovian asteroid in a 1:1 orbital resonance with Jupiter. It is located in the leading Greek camp at the Gas Giant's  Lagrangian point, 60° ahead on its orbit . It is also a non-family asteroid of the Jovian background population. It orbits the Sun at a distance of 4.4–6.0 AU once every 11 years and 11 months (4,338 days; semi-major axis of 5.21 AU). Its orbit has an eccentricity of 0.15 and an inclination of 6° with respect to the ecliptic.

Physical characteristics 

Sthenelos is an assumed, carbonaceous C-type asteroid, while most larger Jupiter trojans are D-type asteroids. It has a high V–I color index of 1.07.

Rotation period 

In August 1995, a rotational lightcurve of Sthenelos was obtained from photometric observations by Italian astronomer Stefano Mottola using the Bochum 0.61-metre Telescope at ESO's La Silla Observatory in Chile. Lightcurve analysis gave a well-defined rotation period of  hours with a brightness amplitude of 0.27 magnitude.

Diameter and albedo 

According to the survey carried out by the NEOWISE mission of NASA's Wide-field Infrared Survey Explorer, Sthenelos measures 34.53 kilometers in diameter and its surface has an albedo of 0.112, while the Collaborative Asteroid Lightcurve Link assumes a standard albedo for a carbonaceous asteroid of 0.057 and calculates a diameter of 46.30 kilometers based on an absolute magnitude of 10.4.

Naming 

This minor planet was named from Greek mythology after Sthenelus, a Greek warrior and companion of Diomedes during the Trojan War. He stole Aeneas' chariot horses and brought it back to the Greek camp. The official naming citation was published by the Minor Planet Center on 27 August 1988.

References

External links 
 Asteroid Lightcurve Database (LCDB), query form (info )
 Dictionary of Minor Planet Names, Google books
 Discovery Circumstances: Numbered Minor Planets (1)-(5000) – Minor Planet Center
 Asteroid 3794 Sthenelos at the Small Bodies Data Ferret
 
 

003794
Discoveries by Carolyn S. Shoemaker
Named minor planets
19851012